NGC 237 is a spiral galaxy located in the constellation Cetus. It was discovered on September 27, 1867 by Truman Safford.

Image gallery

References

External links
 

0237
Barred spiral galaxies
Cetus (constellation)
Discoveries by Truman Safford
002597